Celia Valerie Sawyer (born August 1966) is a British businesswoman, interior designer and dealer both through her own companies and on the Channel 4 programme Four Rooms.

Background
Sawyer was born in Dulwich, South London and grew up near Bournemouth on the south coast of England. She left school aged 15, with few qualifications. An early job was as a dental nurse. She then claims that she "modelled for a few years" but was "not very successful". This led her to starting a business as a photographer's agent, representing photographers and helping them find them work on campaigns for advertising agencies, including Saatchi & Saatchi.

Sawyer turned to property investments, but is best known for her interior design work. She is now a self-made multi-millionaire.

Sawyer is married to Nick, with two children, and divides her time between London, Sandbanks on Poole Harbour, and Barbados. Sawyer is frequently in mainstream press, alongside being a columnist for the Mail Online Hello! Magazine. and The Huffington Post.  Celia's personal style has also garnered attention, with her outfits; and she planned  a homeware collection in 2016.

Career
She is the owner of a Knightsbridge interior design company, Celia Sawyer Luxury Interiors. Most of their clientele are seeking high cost luxury designs.

Sawyer is also a property developer, and has an extensive portfolio of investments from London to Barbados. She has also invested in several film projects and script development.

As a dealer both on and off the big screen, she collects art and collectables and has an extensive client base for which she sources rare and beautiful objects, buying and selling for sporting personalities, celebrities and entrepreneurs.

In 2012 she became one of the four dealers in the TV programme Four Rooms. Sawyer reveals how she saw a Channel 4 advert asking viewers to send in snaps of their vintage treasures that could appear on the programme. Instead of putting forward an intriguing object, Sawyer advertised herself as a curious collectible and emailed her own photo to producers. As one of the dealers on Four Rooms she bids and negotiates for the best possible price for the treasures on offer.

Following on from the success of Four Rooms, Sawyer was selected by the BBC to host a new factual prime-time, entertainment show for BBC One, titled Your Home in Their Hands, which debuted in September 2014. This programme sees amateur designers take over people's homes across the UK for a make-over, often with a twist. The show received in excess of 3 million viewers a week.

Charity
Sawyer won the Inspiration Award for Women in 2013. She raises money for Breakthrough Breast Cancer. Sawyer is a board advisor Football for Peace. Sawyer is also an official ambassador for The British Heart Foundation, Prince's Trust, a patron for the Women's Refuge and supports many other charities.

Awards
Inspirational Woman of the Year, 2013
Royal Television Society award for Four Rooms, 2014
Best Business Programme, 2014 Reality Awards
Named in the Top 100 Most Influential British Entrepreneurs 
Named in the Top 250 Most Powerful Women Leaders

References

External links
Official Website

Living people
1966 births
British interior designers
Channel 4 people
People from Dulwich